Brampton is the third-largest city in the Greater Toronto Area of Ontario, Canada.

Brampton may also refer to:

Places

Australia 
 Brampton Island, Queensland

Canada 
 Brampton, a city in Ontario
 Brampton (electoral district)
 Brampton GO Station, a station in the GO Transit network located in the city
 Brampton North, federal electoral district
 Brampton South, federal electoral district

United Kingdom 
 Brampton, Cambridgeshire
 RAF Brampton
 Brampton, Carlisle, Cumbria
 Brampton, Eden, Cumbria
 Brampton, Derbyshire, a suburb of Chesterfield sometimes called New Brampton
 Brampton, North East Derbyshire, a civil parish containing Old Brampton
 Brampton, Lincolnshire
 Church with Chapel Brampton, a parish of Northamptonshire:
 Church Brampton
 Chapel Brampton
 Brampton Valley Way
 Brampton, Norfolk
 Brampton, Suffolk
 Brampton Bierlow, South Yorkshire (traditionally in the West Riding of Yorkshire)
 Brampton Bryan, Herefordshire

United States 
 Brampton, Michigan, an unincorporated community
 Brampton Township, Michigan
 Brampton Township, Sargent County, North Dakota
 Brampton (Chestertown, Maryland), listed on the NRHP in Maryland
 Brampton (Orange, Virginia), listed on the NRHP in Virginia

People
 Arthur Brampton (1864–1955), British Liberal Party politician
 Brampton Gurdon (disambiguation), list of four people
 Charles Brampton (1828–1895), English cricketer
 Edward Brampton (c.1440–1508), English knight and adventurer of Portuguese origin
 John Brampton, archdeacon of Lewes (England) from 1395 to 1419
 Kenneth Brampton (died 1942), Australian actor
 Sally Brampton (1955–2016), English journalist, writer, and editor

See also 
 Brampton Manor Academy
 Bampton (disambiguation)